Workingman's Death is a 2005 Austrian-German documentary film written and directed by Michael Glawogger. It premiered at the 2005 Venice Film Festival. The film deals with the extremes to which workers go to earn a living in several countries around the world.

The film is composed of six differently titled chapters. The first five depict hazardous conditions of hard laborers around the world and the sixth shows contrasting scenes of youths in a former German industrial complex which had been converted into a leisure park: 
Heroes – Miners of Donets Basin, Ukraine
Ghosts – Sulfur carriers in Ijen, Indonesia
Lions – Butchers in an open-air market in Port Harcourt, Nigeria
Brothers – Welders in the Gadani ship-breaking yard in Pakistan
The Future – Steel workers in Liaoning, China
Epilogue – Youths in Landschaftspark Duisburg-Nord in Germany

Reception
The film was met with a largely positive critical reception with a 73% approval rating reported by Rotten Tomatoes as of March 2011, with several critics praising its visual feel. Walter Addiego of the San Francisco Chronicle''' wrote that "Despite the hardships depicted, many sequences have a dreamlike beauty. In addition, the director has a bone-dry sense of irony; during the Ukraine scenes, he frequently cuts away to a statue of Stakhanov, the 'hero' lauded by the Soviets for his superhuman work habits".

Film critic Nathan Rabin, writing for The A.V. Club, said that "Glawogger is an extraordinarily elegant filmmaker with a photographer's eye for striking compositions. He seems to have selected the jobs documented here as much for their telegenic qualities as their all-around awfulness, and he excels at divining moments of pure cinema and haunting beauty out of the most perilous places and professions on Earth".The Village Voice'''s Michael Atkinson wrote that "Glawogger's film may be thematically loose-jointed, but Wolfgang Thaler's cinematography is the glue; the signature move—a flowing Steadicam track before or following a subject—blooms into variations on a visceral theme, especially as it rhymes the Nigerian butchers stalking through acres of red mud dragging bull heads with the Indonesians carrying rocks down smoking, tourist-littered mountain paths".

References

External links
Official website

Special 4-part TV version of Workingman's Death

2005 films
2005 documentary films
Films directed by Michael Glawogger
Pashto-language films
2000s German-language films
2000s English-language films
Igbo-language films
2000s Mandarin-language films
Indonesian-language films
2000s Russian-language films
Films set in Ukraine
Films set in Indonesia
Films set in Port Harcourt
Films set in Pakistan
Films set in China
Documentary films about the labor movement
Films scored by John Zorn
Yoruba-language films
Austrian documentary films
2005 multilingual films
Austrian multilingual films